Simon Liu Sui Man (born 12 February 1987) is a former Hong Kong professional footballer who played as a right back.

Career statistics

Club

Notes

Trivia
Most notably, he is noted for his inability to pronounce the word "simultaneously" properly.

References

External links
 Yau Yee Football League profile

Living people
1987 births
Hong Kong footballers
Association football defenders
Hong Kong Premier League players
Hong Kong FC players